Nier: Automata Ver1.1a is a 2023 anime television series based on the action role-playing game Nier: Automata developed by PlatinumGames and published by Square Enix. The series is produced by A-1 Pictures and began airing in January 2023, commemorating the sixth anniversary of the video game.

Premise

Based on Square Enix's Nier Automata video game, the story is set during a proxy war between alien-created Machines and human-crafted androids. It focuses on the actions of combat android 2B, and scanner android 9S, as they explore Earth and fight threats.

Characters
YoRHa No.2 Type B (2B)

YoRHa No.9 Type S (9S)

YoRHa Type A No.2 (A2)

Production

The series was announced during the fifth anniversary livestream of Nier: Automata. It is directed by Ryouji Masuyama and animated by A-1 Pictures, with Masuyama and Yoko Taro writing the screenplay, Jun Nakai designing the characters and serving as chief animation director, and MONACA composing the music. The series premiered on January 8, 2023, on Tokyo MX and other networks. The anime is meant to have its own ending as Yoko Taro claimed he did not want to repeat the same story as well as because the original game had its story written so that it could not be replicated in another  form. However, Taro still aims to have the anime faithful to the game. Reprising her role of the protagonist, Yui Ishikawa mentions that the story retains a depressive theme faithful to the original game. Her impression of 2B changed after five years of working in the title and enjoyed her dynamic with Natsuki Hanae (9S) due to the bond they share. Hanae found the anime unique for displaying a different take on the characters' handling when compared to the original game.

Aimer was inspired by the narrative's androids who act human-like to perform her song which also has the idea of tragedy. Amazarashi named the song "Antinomy" because it expresses the conflict from himself as he aims the theme to explore the pain and hatred the characters encounter. Meanwhile, Yoko Taro used the ending theme to create a video about how Machine Lifeforms keep being used as tools for war in an endless cycle. Each episode features a puppet play focusing on a certain alternate ending from the game.

The series' fourth and ninth episode experienced delays due to the COVID-19 pandemic—the former  was postponed from January 28 to February 18. The English dub, featuring the returning cast from the game was announced to begin streaming on Crunchyroll from March 18, 2023.

Episode list

Reception
Inverse praised the series premiere for being accessible for newcomers and faithful to the original game. On the other hand, Nicholas Dupree and Rebecca Silverman from Anime News Network had mixed feelings about the first episode in regards to it accessibility but felt the animation was appealing despite the skimpy clothing the two leads wear. Meanwhile, Richard Eisenbeis and James Beckett from the same site praised the adaptation due to the production values and how the dynamics between 2B and 9S. Anime Feminist stated that while adapting the plot and themes from the original popular game was too difficult, the inclusion of Yoko Taro as a writer seems to make the overall premise positive. Escapist Magazine found the first episode original for constantly switching between the leads' perspectives rather than relying primarily on 2B alone in order to provide a more unique approach to the story and enjoyed Yoko Taro's inclusion in the anime like Anime Feminist.

Notes

References

External links
 
 

2023 anime television series debuts
A-1 Pictures
Aniplex
Anime postponed due to the COVID-19 pandemic
Anime television series based on video games
Dentsu
Drakengard
Medialink
Tokyo MX original programming
Works based on Square Enix video games